Jason Thomas Delay (born March 7, 1995) is an American professional baseball catcher in the Pittsburgh Pirates organization. He made his MLB debut in 2022.

Amateur career
Delay attended Northview High School in Johns Creek, Georgia, and Vanderbilt University, where he played college baseball for the Vanderbilt Commodores. He was a member of the 2014 College World Series champions, and played in the 2015 College World Series, which Vanderbilt lost. In 2015, he played collegiate summer baseball with the Bourne Braves of the Cape Cod Baseball League, and returned to the league in 2016 with the Cotuit Kettleers.

Professional career
The Pittsburgh Pirates selected Delay in the fourth round of the 2017 MLB draft. He signed with the Pirates for a $100,000 signing bonus.

The Pirates promoted him to the major leagues on June 13, 2022. He made his major league debut on June 14 in the first game of a double header against the St. Louis Cardinals. After going 0-for-2 with a walk in his debut, the Pirates optioned Delay back to Triple-A Indianapolis Indians. He was outrighted off the roster on November 10, 2022.

References

External links

Living people
1995 births
Sportspeople from Plano, Texas
People from Fulton County, Georgia
Baseball players from Texas
Baseball players from Georgia (U.S. state)
Major League Baseball catchers
Pittsburgh Pirates players
Vanderbilt Commodores baseball players
Bourne Braves players
Cotuit Kettleers players
Bristol Pirates players
West Virginia Black Bears players
Bradenton Marauders players
Altoona Curve players
Peoria Javelinas players
Indianapolis Indians players